Carlos "Charlie" Asensio (born January 18, 2000) is an American soccer player who currently plays as a left-back for Major League Soccer club Austin FC.

Career

Youth
Asensio attended Alan C. Pope High School, playing as part of the IMG Academy until 2014, before joining Georgia United who later went on to form the academy club for Atlanta United in 2016. In 2018, Asensio appeared on the bench for Atlanta United 2 during a USL Championship fixture against Indy Eleven, but did not make an appearance.

Before attending college, Asensio played with the United States under-17 and under-19 squads.

College
In 2018, Asensio went to Clemson University to play college soccer. In four seasons with the Tigers, Asensio made 82 appearances and tallied nine assists. He was named ACC All-Freshman Team in 2018, and Second Team All-ACC in 2019, and helped the Tigers win the NCAA Men’s Soccer National Championship in 2021.

Professional
On January 11, 2022, Asensio was drafted 35th overall in the 2022 MLS SuperDraft by Austin FC. He officially signed with Austin on February 23, 2022. On July 8, 2022, Asensio was loaned to USL Championship side Charleston Battery for the remainder of the season. He made his professional debut the following day, appearing as a 66th–minute substitute during a 3–0 loss to Birmingham Legion.

Personal
Asensio's mother is from Panama.

Career statistics

Club

References

External links
 

2000 births
Living people
Association football defenders
American soccer players
Atlanta United 2 players
Austin FC draft picks
Austin FC players
Charleston Battery players
Clemson Tigers men's soccer players
Soccer players from Georgia (U.S. state)
United States men's youth international soccer players
USL Championship players